Dlapkin Dol is a village in the municipality of Kičevo, North Macedonia. It used to be part of the former Zajas Municipality.

Demographics
As of the 2021 census, Dlapkin Dol had 388 residents with the following ethnic composition:
Albanians 368
Persons for whom data are taken from administrative sources 20

According to the 2002 census, the village had a total of 636 inhabitants. Ethnic groups in the village include:
Albanians – 633
Macedonians – 1
Others – 2

References

External links

Villages in Kičevo Municipality
Albanian communities in North Macedonia